Central stations or central railway stations emerged in the second half of the nineteenth century as railway stations that had initially been built on the edge of city centres were enveloped by urban expansion and became an integral part of the city centres themselves. As a result, "Central Station" is often, but not always, part of the proper name for a railway station that is the central or primary railway hub for a city.

Development

Emergence and growth 
Central stations emerged in the second half of the nineteenth century during what has been termed the "Railway Age". Initially railway stations were built on the edge of city centres but, subsequently, with urban expansion, they became an integral part of the city centres themselves.

For example, the first centralized railway terminal in Germany was Hanover Hauptbahnhof, built in 1879. This set the precedent for other major German cities. Frankfurt followed in 1888 and Cologne in the 1890s. Classic German central railway station architecture "reached its zenith" with the completion of Hamburg Hauptbahnhof in 1906 and Leipzig Hauptbahnhof in 1915.

In Europe, it was normal for the authorities to exercise greater control over railway development than in Britain and this meant that the central station was often the focal point of town planning. "Indeed, in most large continental cities the station was deliberately fronted by a square to set it off." During the 1880s "world leadership in large station design passed to Germany, where state funding helped secure the building of central stations on a lavish scale." By contrast, British entrepreneurialism led to a great diversity of ownership and rights and a lack of centralised coherence in the construction of major stations.

In time the urban expansion that put many of these stations at the heart of a city, also hemmed them in so that, although they became increasingly central to the town or city, they were further away from airports or, in some cases, other transport hubs such as bus stations leading to a lack of interoperability and interconnectivity between the different modes of transport.

A revival of fortunes for central stations arose during the 1980s, boosted by the advent of high speed rail and light rail services, that saw opportunities being seized for upgrading central stations and their facilities to create large intermodal transport hubs simultaneously serving many modes of transport, while providing a range of modern facilities for the traveller, creating a "city within a city."

Present-day function

Transport nodes 
Today, central stations, particularly in Europe, act as termini for a multitude of rail services - suburban, regional, domestic and international - provided by national carriers or private companies, on conventional rail networks, underground railways and tram systems. These services are often divided between several levels. In many cases, central railway stations are collocated with bus stations as well as taxi services.

Industrial and commercial centres 
Central railway stations are not just major transportation nodes but may also be "a specific section of the city with a concentration of infrastructure but also with a diversified collection of buildings and open spaces" which makes them "one of the most complex social areas" of the city. This has drawn in railway business - freight and local industry using the marshalling yards - and commercial business - shops, cafes and entertainment facilities.

High speed rail 
The reinvigoration of central stations since the 1980s has been, in part, due to the rise of high speed rail services. But countries have taken different approaches. France gave greater weight to 'peripheral stations', stations external to cities and new high speed lines. Germany and Italy went for the modification of existing lines and central stations. Spain opted for a hybrid approach with new high speed railway lines using existing central stations.

"Central Station" as a name

English-speaking countries 
"Central Station" is a common proper name for a railway station that is the central or primary railway hub for a city, for example, Manchester Central, which is not to be confused with those stations in which "Central" appears in name not because they were "central" in the sense above but because they were once served by railway companies with "Central" as part of their name. For example, Leicester Central railway station was owned by the Great Central Railway, and Central Station (Chicago) was owned by the Illinois Central Railroad.

Non-English-speaking countries 
When translating foreign station names, "Central Station" is commonly used if the literal meaning of the station's name is "central station", "principal station" or "main station". An example of the last is the Danish word hovedbanegård. Travel and rail sources such as Rough Guides, Thomas Cook European Timetable and Deutsche Bahn's passenger information generally use the native name, but tourist, travel and railway operator websites as well as the English publications of some national railway operators often use "Central Station" or "central railway station" instead.

Non-English names for "Central Station" include:
 Централна гара (tsentralna gara) in Bulgarian
 střed in Czech
 Centraal Station (abbreviated formerly as CS and currently as Centraal) in Dutch
 Gare centrale in French
 Hauptbahnhof, historically also Centralbahnhof or Zentralbahnhof, in German
 תחנה מרכזית (tahana merkazit) in Hebrew
 Stazione Centrale (abbreviated C.le) in Italian
 sentralstasjon in Norwegian
 Estação Central in Portuguese
 Estación Central in Spanish
 centralstation (abbreviated central or C) in Swedish

Non-English terms that literally mean "principal station" or "main station" are often translated into English as "Central":
 Glavni kolodvor (abbreviated Gl. kol.) in Croatian
 hlavní nádraží (abbreviated hl. n.) in Czech
 hovedbanegård (abbreviated H) in Danish
 Hauptbahnhof (abbreviated Hbf in Germany and Austria and HB in Switzerland) in German
 Dworzec Główny (abbreviated Gł.) in Polish
 hlavná stanica (abbreviated hl. st.) in Slovak

Examples of central stations 
The following are examples of stations from around the world where "Central Station" is part of their name in English or can be translated as such from their native language.

Europe

Austria 
 Wien Hauptbahnhof
 Graz Hauptbahnhof
 Linz Hauptbahnhof
 Salzburg Hauptbahnhof
 Innsbruck Hauptbahnhof
 St. Pölten Hauptbahnhof
 Wels Hauptbahnhof
 Wörgl Hauptbahnhof
 Leoben Hauptbahnhof

Belarus 
 Brest Central Station (Brest-Centralny, Брест-Центральный)

Belgium 

Three stations in Belgium are named "-Central" (Dutch Centraal).
 Antwerp Central Station (Antwerpen-Centraal)
 Brussels Central Station (Bruxelles-Central / Brussel-Centraal) - not to be confused with the city's main international station, Brussels Midi (meaning "Brussels south"; the French word "Midi" is generally used as the station's name in English).
 Verviers-Central railway station (Verviers-Central)

Bulgaria 
There are three stations with "central" in their names:
 Central Railway Station, Sofia  (Централна гара София)
 Central Railway Station, Plovdiv (Централна гара Пловдив)
 Ruse Central railway station (Централна гара Русе)

Czechia 
The following stations are named "main station" (abbreviated hl.n.):
 Brno hlavní nádraží (Brno)
 Česká Lípa hlavní nádraží (Česká Lípa)
 Děčín hlavní nádraží (Děčín)
 Hradec Králové hlavní nádraží (Hradec Králové)
 Karviná hlavní nádraží (Karviná)
 Kutná Hora hlavní nádraží (Kutná Hora)
 Mladá Boleslav hlavní nádraží (Mladá Boleslav)
 Nymburk hlavní nádraží (Nymburk)
 Olomouc hlavní nádraží (Olomouc)
 Ostrava hlavní nádraží (Ostrava)
 Pardubice hlavní nádraží (Pardubice)
 Plzeň hlavní nádraží (Pilsen)
 Praha hlavní nádraží (Prague)
 Hlavní nádraží - the corresponding metro station in Prague
 Prostějov hlavní nádraží (Prostějov)
 Trutnov hlavní nádraží (Trutnov)
 Ústí nad Labem hlavní nádraží (Ústí nad Labem)

The following stations are named "central" (střed):
 Brumov střed (Brumov)
 Louny střed (Louny)
 Mikulášovice střed (Mikulášovice)
 Ostrava střed (Ostrava)
 Smržovka střed (Smržovka)
 Trutnov střed (Trutnov)
 Zlín střed (Zlín)

In addition to the above, Praha Masarykovo nádraží was named "Praha střed" from 1953 until 1990.

Denmark 
Two Danish stations, as follows,  have names often translated as "Central".
 Aarhus Central Station – the busiest Danish station outside the Copenhagen area
Copenhagen Central Station – the largest station in Denmark
Both stations bear the title of Hovedbanegård in Danish, which literally translated means main-(rail)way-yard, but which actually refers to the infrastructure complexity, size and importance. A station of lesser importance is calld a banegård. However a city can have several banegårde as well as a hovedbanegård, and several cities and towns that have a banegård such as Aalborg do not have a hovedbanegård. Thus, Copenhagen Central Station is not the most central in Copenhagen, nor is it the most central that serves a broad range of routes, that would be Nørreport Station, which has been translated into English as Nørreport Metro Station. Copenhagen Central Station is however the most important, with its many more platforms and historic facilities (that has now been moved to other locations, in response to changed need from modern locomotives, wagons and coaches), and despite serving almost the same amount of regional and intercity trains as Nørreport, it allows for longer stops and with much more room for passengers to traverse the station along serving international trains.

Finland 

Two Finnish stations can be translated to central:
 Helsinki Central railway station (Finnish: Helsingin päärautatieasema, Swedish: Helsingfors centralstation)
 Turku Central railway station (Finnish: Turun päärautatieasema, Swedish: Åbo centralstation)

Germany 

The German word for "central station" is Hauptbahnhof (literally "main railway station"); historically Centralbahnhof and Zentralbahnhof were also used. Geographically central stations may be named Mitte or Stadtmitte ("city centre"), e.g. Koblenz Stadtmitte station. In most German cities with more than one passenger station, the principal station is usually the Hauptbahnhof; some German sources translate this as "central station" although stations named Hauptbahnhof may not be centrally located.

While using Hauptbahnhof in its journey planner and passenger information, in English-language publications Deutsche Bahn uses variously Hauptbahnhof, Main and Central.

The following stations historically bore the name Centralbahnhof or Zentralbahnhof as part of their proper name (See Centralbahnhof):

 Chemnitz Hauptbahnhof
 Köln Hauptbahnhof
 Frankfurt Hauptbahnhof
 Hamburg Dammtor station: documents from around the time of the opening of the station refer to Centralbahnhof. or Zentral-Bahnhof.
 Ingolstadt Hauptbahnhof
 Magdeburg Hauptbahnhof
 Mainz Hauptbahnhof
 München Hauptbahnhof until 1 May 1904.
 Oldenburg Hauptbahnhof (called Centralbahnhof Oldenburg from 1879 to 1911)
 Osnabrück Hauptbahnhof
 Stuttgart Zentralbahnhof (or Centralbahnhof) was a centrally located station on the Zentralbahn (replaced by Stuttgart Hauptbahnhof, which opened on a new site east of the centre in 1922).

Italy 
 Agrigento Centrale railway station
 Bari Centrale railway station
 Barletta Centrale railway station (FNB)
 Bologna Centrale railway station
 Catania Centrale railway station
 Gorizia Centrale railway station
 La Spezia Centrale railway station
 Lamezia Terme Centrale railway station
 Livorno Centrale railway station
 Messina Centrale railway station
 Milano Centrale railway station
 Napoli Centrale railway station
 Palermo Centrale railway station
 Pescara Centrale railway station
 Pisa Centrale railway station
 Prato Centrale railway station
 Reggio Calabria Centrale railway station
 Tarvisio Centrale railway station - now closed
 Torre Annunziata Centrale railway station
 Trieste Centrale railway station
 Treviglio railway station, also known as Treviglio Centrale
 Treviso Centrale railway station

Netherlands 
In the Netherlands, a centraal station (abbreviated CS), in its original sense, was a railway station served by several railway companies; so it had the same meaning as a union station in the USA. Since the various private railways were merged in the early 20th century into a national railway, the term came to mean, in everyday language, the main railway station of a city.

Since the 2000s, the rule is that a city's principal station may be called "Centraal" if it has more than a certain number of passengers per day (currently 40.000). This meant that Almere Centraal had to be demoted to "Almere Centrum"; however, Leiden was renamed "Leiden Centraal". Additionally, stations with international high-speed trains may be given the name Centraal; this applies to Arnhem. Breda was intended to receive the epithet after renovation in 2016, but since high speed services do not yet call there, it is still called Breda.

Non-railway signage, such as on buses or roads, sometimes indicates Centraal or CS even when a city's main railway station is not actually so named.

Eight stations have the word Centraal:
 Amsterdam Centraal
 Den Haag Centraal
 Leiden Centraal
 Rotterdam Centraal
 Utrecht Centraal
 Arnhem Centraal
 Eindhoven Centraal
 Amersfoort Centraal

There are also stations with the word Centrum, which indicates the station is in the city centre:
 Almere Centrum
 Barneveld Centrum
 Ede Centrum
 Kerkrade Centrum
 Lelystad Centrum
 Schiedam Centrum
 Veenendaal Centrum
 Vlaardingen Centrum

Norway 
 Oslo Central Station (Oslo Sentralstasjon)
 Trondheim Central Station (Trondheim Sentralstasjon)

Poland 

The designation "main station" (Dworzec główny, abbreviated to " Gł.") is used in many Polish cities to indicate the most important passenger or goods station, for instance Szczecin Główny. However, there is an exception:

Warszawa Centralna railway station is the principal station in Warsaw, but Warszawa Główna railway station (reopened in March 2021) is the terminus for several train services.

The following stations are named "main station" (dworzec główny):

The adjective "main" is thus not used only for stations in a few capitals of voivodeships, including: Białystok, Gorzów Wielkopolski, Katowice, Kielce and Łódź.

Sweden 

In Sweden the term "central station" (Centralstation, abbreviated to Central or C) is used to indicate the primary station in towns and cities with more than one railway station. Many are termini for one or more lines. However, the term can also occur in a broader sense, even being used for the only railway station in a town. In some cases, this is because other stations have closed; but in others the station is called "central" even though there has only ever been one. In these cases, the term "central" was used to highlight the level of service provided, due to the station's importance in the network, particularly at important railway junctions.

Switzerland 

As in Germany, the most important station in Zürich is Zürich Hauptbahnhof, which is sometimes translated as central station.

Additionally, Basel SBB railway station was originally known as the Centralbahnhof or, in English, Basle Central Station and is still sometimes referred to today as the Centralbahnhof or Basel/Basle Central Station.

Turkey 

 Adana Central railway station
 Ankara Central railway station
 Eskişehir Central railway station
 Gaziantep Central railway station
 İstanbul Sirkeci railway station
 İzmir Alsancak railway station
 Kars Central railway station
 Kayseri Central railway station
 Mersin Central railway station

United Kingdom 

Many railway stations in Britain that use 'Central' are not principal stations, and are called Central to distinguish them from other stations with different names, or for prestige. In some cases, a station originally owned by the Great Central Railway in locations served by more than one station was called Central. Town also appears: for example  distinguishes it from  station.

One of the few principal stations in Britain that is called 'Central' and truly is in the centre of the city it serves is Glasgow Central. Though Glasgow was once served by four principal terminus stations, all within the city centre, only one was called 'Central'. With a few exceptions such as the Argyle line, Glasgow Central serves all stations south of the city while Glasgow Queen Street is the principal station for all services north of the city. Likewise, Cardiff Central is located in the city centre and is the mainline hub of the South Wales rail network, which includes 19 other stations in Cardiff itself, including another principal city centre station, Cardiff Queen Street.

Not all the stations in the following list still exist.

 Acton Central railway station
 Belfast Central railway station
 Birkenhead Central railway station
 Brackley Central railway station
 Burnley Central railway station
 Cardiff Central railway station
 Central railway station (London)
 Central Croydon railway station
 Chesterfield Central railway station
 Coatbridge Central railway station
 Dumbarton Central railway station
 Exeter Central railway station
 Finchley Central tube station
 Folkestone Central railway station
 Gainsborough Central railway station
 Glasgow Central railway station
 Greenock Central railway station
 Hackney Central railway station
 Hamilton Central railway station
 Helensburgh Central railway station
 Hendon Central tube station
 Hounslow Central tube station
 Hyde Central railway station
 Kirkby-in-Ashfield Central railway station
 Leicester Central railway station
 Lincoln Central railway station
 Liverpool Central railway station
 Loughborough Central railway station
 Manchester Central railway station
 Mansfield Central railway station
 Milton Keynes Central railway station
 New Mills Central railway station
 Newcastle Central railway station and associated Central Station Metro station
 Redcar Central railway station
 Rotherham Central railway station
 Rugby Central railway station
 St Helens Central railway station
 St Helens Central (GCR) railway station
 Salford Central railway station
 Scarborough Central railway station
 Southampton Central railway station
 Southend Central railway station
 Staveley Central railway station
 Sutton-in-Ashfield Central railway station
 Telford Central railway station
 Tuxford Central railway station
 Walthamstow Central station
 Warrington Central railway station
 Wembley Central station
 Windsor & Eton Central railway station
 Wrexham Central railway station

Central America

Cuba
 Central Railway Station, Havana, commuter and national rail station in Havana

North America

Canada
 Central station (Edmonton), in Edmonton
 Montreal Central Station, in Montreal
 Guelph Central Station, an intermodal (rail/bus) station in Guelph

United States
In the United States, several "Central" stations were built by railways called "Central", the best known example being Grand Central Station in New York City, which is so named because it was built by the New York Central Railroad.

This contrasts with a union station, which, in the past, served more than one railway company (the equivalent term in Europe is a joint station). The government-funded Amtrak took over the operation of all intercity passenger rail in the 1970s and 1980s.
 Buffalo Central Terminal, in Buffalo, New York
 Central Station, Chicago
 Grand Central Station, Chicago
 Central (CTA Green Line), Chicago, Illinois
 Central (CTA Purple Line), Evanston, Illinois
 Central Station (JTA Skyway), Jacksonville, Florida
 Central Station (Memphis), Memphis, Tennessee
 MiamiCentral, Miami, Florida
 Grand Central Terminal, New York City
 Great Central Station, Chicago

South America

Argentina
 Estación Central in Buenos Aires, Argentina operated from 1872 to 1897.

Brazil

In Brazil, "Central Station" is called as "Estação Central" and can be a place that integrates bus or train.
 Central do Brasil, in Rio de Janeiro
 Estação da Luz, in São Paulo

Chile
 Estación Alameda in Santiago, Chile is known unofficially as Estación Central

Asia

Mainland China

The stations in special and first classes, with numerous trunk lines passing and tens of thousands of passengers boarding and alighting each day, could be regarded as a "central station" in respective cities.

Hong Kong
 Hung Hom station, the terminus for Beijing–Kowloon railway, Guangzhou–Kowloon through train, Beijing–Kowloon through train, Shanghai–Kowloon through train, East Rail line and West Rail line
 Central and Hong Kong stations, a main interchange station of the MTR rapid transit system (located in Central; served by the Airport Express, Island line, Tsuen Wan line and Tung Chung line.)
 Kowloon station, a central station in West Kowloon of the MTR rapid transit system (served by the Airport Express and Tung Chung line; linked with West Kowloon station, served by the Guangzhou–Shenzhen–Hong Kong Express Rail Link)
 Tuen Mun station, an interchange station in Tuen Mun (served by the West Rail line and several light rail routes)
 Sha Tin station, a central station in Sha Tin New Town
 Tung Chung station, a central station on Lantau Island

India
 Kanpur Central (CNB), in Kanpur, Uttar Pradesh
 Mangalore Central (MAQ) in Mangalore, Karnataka
 Mumbai Central (BCT), in Mumbai, Maharashtra
 Trivandrum Central (TVC), in Trivandrum, Kerala
 MGR Chennai Central (MAS), in Chennai, Tamil Nadu

Indonesia
 Manggarai Central Station (MRI) in Tebet, South Jakarta

Israel
 Be'er Sheva Center railway station, Be'er Sheva
 Haifa Center HaShmona railway station, Haifa
 Modi'in Central railway station, Modi'in
 Tel Aviv Savidor Central railway station, Tel Aviv

Japan
 Kagoshima-Chūō Station in Kagoshima, formerly Nishi-Kagoshima Station

Malaysia
Sentral is the Malay spelling for the English word central.
 Kuala Lumpur Sentral station, in Kuala Lumpur

South Korea
In South Korea, major railway stations of the city don't usually have additional names, like these examples below. 
 Seoul Station in Seoul
 Busan Station in Busan

However, some stations do have a term 중앙(Jungang)(literally. Central) in their names to differentiate the original station. These stations are usually located in the closer location to the city center. 
 Changwon Jungang station in Changwon
 Jung-ang station (Uijeongbu) in Uijeongbu
 Dongducheon Jungang station in Dongducheon
 Samseong Jungang station in Samseong-dong, Seoul

Also, there are Jungang metro stations which are named after the neighborhood name, Jungang-dong.
 Jungang station (Ansan)
 Jungang station (Busan Metro)

Taiwan
 Taipei Main Station in Taipei City
 Taichung railway station in Taichung City
 Kaohsiung Main Station in Kaohsiung City

Thailand
Bangkok railway station will no longer be active in 2021, when it will be converted into a museum. It will change its official name to Hua Lamphong Station. The State Railway of Thailand will move Bangkok's central station operations to Bang Sue Grand Station.

Africa

South Africa
 Johannesburg Park Station, Johannesburg

Australia

 Central railway station, Brisbane
 Melbourne Central railway station, named after Melbourne Central Shopping Centre, Melbourne
 Central railway station, Sydney, also known as Sydney Terminal, Sydney
 Gawler Central railway station, Adelaide
 Wynnum Central railway station, Brisbane
 Cockburn Central railway station, Perth

Notes

Railway stations by type